Matsohely is a commune in northern Madagascar. It belongs to the district of Andapa, which is a part of Sava Region. According to a 2001 census, the population of Matsohely was 7,565.

Only primary schooling is available in town. The majority (99.3%) of the population are farmers.  The most important crop is rice, while other important products are peanuts, coffee and beans.  Services provide employment for 0.7% of the population.

References and notes 

Populated places in Sava Region